Stormbreaker (titled Alex Rider: Operation Stormbreaker in the United States) is a 2006 action spy film directed by Geoffrey Sax. The screenplay by Anthony Horowitz is based on his 2000 novel Stormbreaker, the first novel in the Alex Rider series. The film stars Alex Pettyfer as Alex Rider, and also stars Mickey Rourke, Bill Nighy, Sophie Okonedo, Alicia Silverstone, Sarah Bolger, Stephen Fry and Ewan McGregor. Stormbreaker was an international co-production between companies and financiers from the United Kingdom, the United States, and Germany.

The film's plot follows a teenage boy who is recruited by MI6 after his uncle, a secret agent, is killed in action. He is sent on a mission in Cornwall to gather intelligence behind Stormbreaker, an advanced computer system being provided to schools across Britain, and its creator, billionaire Darrius Sayle.

Intended to be the first entry in a film franchise, Stormbreaker grossed between $20.7 and $23.9 million worldwide upon its theatrical release, failing to recoup its $40 million budget and making the film a box office bomb. According to Rotten Tomatoes, the film was largely criticized for its lack of originality and believability. As a result of these factors, plans to produce further Alex Rider films were dropped. A rebooted TV series, Alex Rider, premiered on Amazon Prime Video in 2020.

Plot
Alex Rider is a 14-year-old schoolboy who lives with his uncle Ian and their housekeeper Jack Starbright. Ian is supposedly a bank manager and is, much to Alex's regret, often away from home. One day, Alex is told that his uncle has died in a car crash, but quickly discovers that his uncle was actually a spy working for MI6 and was murdered.

He is then recruited by his uncle's former employers, Alan Blunt and Mrs. Jones of the Special Operations Division of MI6, who explains to Alex that his uncle has been training him as a spy. Alex initially refuses to cooperate but agrees when they threaten to block renewal of Jack's visa and have her deported. Alex is then sent to a military training camp in the Brecon Beacons, the home of the British Special Air Service. At first, his fellow trainees look down on him because of his age, but he soon gains their respect with skills learned from his unwitting training.

He sets off on his first mission, aided by gadgets from Smithers. Billionaire Darrius Sayle is donating free high-powered computer systems code named Stormbreaker to every school in the United Kingdom. MI6 is suspicious of his seemingly generous plans and sends Alex undercover as a competition winner to investigate. There, he meets Sayle himself and his two accomplices, Mr. Grin and Nadia Vole, and is shown the Stormbreaker computer in action. Later, while Alex is having dinner with Sayle, the suspicious Vole steals Alex's phone and tracks the SIM card to his house in Chelsea. She goes there and finds Alex's true identity; while there, she is disturbed by and consequently fights Jack. Despite being outclassed, Jack wins with the help of a blowfish, leaving Nadia to flee the scene. That night, Alex sneaks out of his bedroom window to observe a midnight delivery of mysterious containers to Sayle's lair.

The next day, Alex finds himself in trouble when his cover is blown. After attempting to escape from the facility, he is captured, and Sayle explains his true reasons behind Stormbreaker – each system contains a modified strain of the smallpox virus which, upon activation in the Stormbreaker release, will kill all of the country's schoolchildren. Sayle leaves Alex tied up and departs for the London Science Museum. Nadia drops Alex into a water tank to be killed by a giant Portuguese man o' war, but he escapes using the metal-disintegrating spot cream supplied by Smithers, Nadia is subdued when she is hit by the jellyfish, rupturing the tank in the process. Alex then hitches a ride on a Mil Mi-8 helicopter piloted by Mr. Grin, using a sodium pentothal arrow to gain Mr. Grin's obedience. Alex parachutes out of the helicopter and lands just as the Prime Minister is about to press the button which will activate the computers. Alex uses a rifle to shoot the podium, which destroys the button, and ruins Sayle's plan.

Furious, Sayle leaves to carry out his backup plan, and Alex, with the help of school friend Sabina Pleasure, pursues Sayle through the streets of London on horseback. Fifty floors up on one of Sayle's skyscrapers, Alex reaches him and unplugs his backup transmitter. Sayle chases him out onto the roof and pushes both Alex & Sabina off the roof, leaving them hanging by a dislodged cable. Unexpectedly, Yassen arrives in a helicopter and shoots Sayle (in the same manner he did Ian) before rescuing Alex. Yassen then tells Alex that Sayle had become an embarrassment to his employers, and that Alex should forget about him, but Alex refuses saying that the killing of his uncle Ian means they are still enemies.

Alex returns to school; he and Sabina are talking about what happened and he says that it will never happen again. The film ends with someone observing Alex from a distance. He notices it and realizes that it's not the end.

Cast
 Alex Pettyfer as Alex Rider
 Mickey Rourke as Darrius Sayle
 Alicia Silverstone as Jack Starbright
 Bill Nighy as Alan Blunt
 Sophie Okonedo as Mrs. Jones
 Damian Lewis as Yassen Gregorovich
 Missi Pyle as Nadia Vole
 Stephen Fry as Smithers
 Sarah Bolger as Sabina Pleasure
 Andy Serkis as Mr. Grin
 Ashley Walters as Wolf
 Ewan McGregor as Ian Rider
 Robbie Coltrane as the Prime Minister
 Jimmy Carr as John Crawford

Production

Stormbreaker was intended by the novel's author, Anthony Horowitz, to be the first entry in a film franchise based on his Alex Rider series. Horowitz, already an established and prolific screenwriter in British television, wrote the screenplay and worked very closely throughout the film's production with director Geoffrey Sax and producers Marc and Peter Samuelson. The Weinstein Company acquired the North American rights to the film, which was filmed in Summer 2005 with six weeks on the Isle of Man and a further six weeks in London. Some of the scenes of the school were filmed in The Grey Coat Hospital and Ballakermeen High School, Douglas, Isle of Man.

In 2005, Alex Pettyfer was cast as Alex Rider. He was picked out of 500 hopefuls who auditioned for the role. Pettyfer was originally offered a role in the then-upcoming film Eragon but turned it down, noting that he preferred Stormbreaker because it would be filmed nearer home while Eragon would film in the Czech Republic.

In June 2006, the producers signed a deal with Nintendo that made the Nintendo DS a prominent feature in the film, much like the Power Glove in The Wizard. This is an upgrade from the Game Boy Color that Alex used in the novel version.  A tie-in game, Alex Rider: Stormbreaker was also released on the said DS and its predecessor, the Game Boy Advance.  In addition to the Nintendo marketing in the film, Alex's cell phone is a Nokia 7710 and uses a sodium pentothal pen to get to London, not a gun.

In August 2006, the film was retitled Alex Rider: Operation Stormbreaker for North American release. A new poster and trailer were released along with the announcement. It was also revealed that the US premiere would take place on the Intrepid aircraft carrier at the Hudson River, New York City.

The name of the villain also changed from Herod Sayle to Darrius Sayle, with his nationality switched from Lebanese (Egyptian in the US version of the novel) to American. This was because Mickey Rourke was already in talks to take on the role, so Horowitz adapted the character to suit him.

Reception

Box office
Stormbreaker was distributed by Entertainment Film Distributors in the United Kingdom, where the film made $2,313,496 on its opening weekend, well below its expected target of blockbuster status. The film's grosses gradually declined each week for the remainder of its run, totalling of $12,872,046, making up more than half of what would become the film's final worldwide gross. In the United States, the film was distributed by The Weinstein Company in 221 theatres and grossed $215,177, with an average of $973 per screen and ranking No. 27 during its opening weekend. The film earned $677,646 in the United States and $23,260,224 internationally for a total of $23,937,870 on an estimated budget of $40 million. The Numbers reported a worldwide gross of $20.7 million. In Germany, the film was given a direct-to-video release.

In a 2007 interview for Reuters, Horowitz blamed Stormbreakers financial failings on The Weinstein Company's handling of the film's distribution on the American market, particularly their decision to not give it a wide release. According to the writer, "Harvey Weinstein decided not to distribute it. It is one of the most bizarre and annoying things that the film didn't get given its shot in America. To this day I don't know why."

Critical response
On Rotten Tomatoes, a review aggregator, the film has a score of 35% based on 69 reviews with an average rating of 4.7 out of 10. The critical consensus states "Alex Rider: Operation Stormbreaker is strictly children's fare, as it lacks originality, excitement, and believability." The film also has a score of 42 out of 100 on Metacritic based on 20 reviews, indicating "mixed or average reviews".

BBC critic Neil Smith gave the film three out of five stars but criticised the "unsubtle turns" from both Bill Nighy and Stephen Fry. The Hollywood Reporter branded the film as "a lame and disappointing affair". Although likening it to both the Harry Potter and James Bond series, reviewer Ray Bennett said the film "lacks any kind of suspense" due to the script. He ended saying that Stormbreaker was unlikely to have a "license to kill at the box-office". Cinema Blend editor-in-chief Josh Tyler gave the film two and a half stars out of five, and said that, "Most of the problems with Stormbreaker all boil down to believability." Boston.coms reporter Wesley Morris also gave Stormbreaker two stars out of five, and said that "Geoffrey Sax's filmmaking holds few surprises... but it's swift and competent, despite too many shots of cars on roads that bloat the running time."

Author's response
During a 2013 interview with the Financial Times, Horowitz stated that the Stormbreaker film was his greatest disappointment, stating that he "did not hate it but that it should have been the first of 10 and it wasn't."

Cancelled sequels
Prior to or after Stormbreakers theatrical release, Horowitz had written a screenplay based on Point Blanc, but stated that the chances of further films based on the Alex Rider novels were "fairly slim" due to the film's underperformance at the box office. The Weinstein Company eventually cancelled their plans for a sequel, and Horowitz later expressed that the novels "do not translate well to the big screen".

TV adaption 
A rebooted television series beginning with the second novel Point Blanc was produced by Eleventh Hour Films and Sony Pictures Television. The series was released on Amazon Prime Video and TVNZ OnDemand in June 2020.

References

External links
 
 
 
 
 
 

2006 films
2006 action films
2000s adventure films
British adventure films
British spy films
British action films
American action adventure films
American spy action films
British children's adventure films
American children's adventure films
English-language German films
German adventure films
German spy action films
Alex Rider
Films about orphans
Films about the Secret Intelligence Service
Films based on British novels
Films set in Cornwall
Films set in London
Films set in Wales
Films shot in London
Museums in popular culture
Films shot at Pinewood Studios
The Weinstein Company films
Metro-Goldwyn-Mayer films
Films directed by Geoffrey Sax
Films with screenplays by Anthony Horowitz
Films based on young adult literature
2000s English-language films
2000s American films
2000s British films
2000s German films